General Luna, officially the Municipality of General Luna,  is a 4th class municipality in the province of Quezon, Philippines. According to the 2020 census, it has a population of 24,804 people.

Geography

Barangays
General Luna is politically subdivided into 27 barangays.

 Bacong Ibaba
 Bacong Ilaya
 Barangay 1 (Poblacion)
 Barangay 2 (Poblacion)
 Barangay 3 (Poblacion)
 Barangay 4 (Poblacion)
 Barangay 5 (Poblacion)
 Barangay 6 (Poblacion)
 Barangay 7 (Poblacion)
 Barangay 8 (Poblacion)
 Barangay 9 (Poblacion)
 Lavides
 Magsaysay
 Malaya
 Nieva
 Recto
 San Ignacio Ibaba
 San Ignacio Ilaya
 San Isidro Ibaba
 San Isidro Ilaya 
 San Jose
 San Nicolas
 San Vicente
 Santa Maria Ibaba
 Santa Maria Ilaya
 Sumilang
 Villarica

Climate

Demographics

Economy

References

External links

 General Luna Profile at PhilAtlas.com
 [ Philippine Standard Geographic Code]
 Philippine Census Information
 Local Governance Performance Management System 

Municipalities of Quezon